Tom Scott and The L.A. Express is a Jazz/Fusion album released in 1974 by Tom Scott backed by the L.A. Express.

Track listing
"Bless My Soul" (Sample, Guerin, Carlton, Bennett, Scott) - 4:09
"Sneakin' in the Back" (Sample, Guerin, Carlton, Bennett, Scott) - 4:33
"King Cobra" (Scott) - 4:23
"Dahomey Dance" (John Coltrane) - 3:43
"Nunya" (Bennett) - 3:40
"Easy Life" (Scott) - 3:01
"Spindrift" (Scott) - 5:44
"Strut Your Stuff" (Scott) - 3:37
"L.A. Expression" (Bennett) - 6:23
"Vertigo" (Bennett) - 2:30

Personnel
Tom Scott and The L.A. Express
Tom Scott - horns, woodwinds, synthesizer, producer
Larry Carlton - guitar
Robben Ford - guitar
Max Bennett - bass
Joe Sample - piano, keyboards
Larry Nash - keyboards
John Guerin - drums, percussion
Technical
Hank Cicalo - recording, mixing
Chuck Beeson - art direction
Joe Garnett - patch and buckle design
Jim McCrary - photography

Later samples
"Sneakin' in the Back"
"Justify My Love (Hip Hop Mix)" by Madonna (1990)
"Blue Lines" by Massive Attack from the album Blue Lines (1991)
"I Won't Give Up" by Deee-Lite from the album Infinity Within (1992)
"Souljah's Story" by 2Pac from the album 2Pacalypse Now (1991)
"Soul by the Pound" by Common Sense from the album Can I Borrow a Dollar? (1992)
"Dieu Reconnaîtra Les Siens" by DJ Cam from the album Underground Vibes (1994)
"Edge of Blue" by DJ Krush from the album Krush (1994)
"Something Wicked This Way Comes" by Barry Adamson from the album Oedipus Schmoedipus (1996)
"Bells of War" by Wu-Tang Clan from the album Wu-Tang Forever (1997)
"Love No Hoe (demo)" by The Notorious B.I.G. from the album Notorious: Original Motion Picture Soundtrack (2009)
"Life Is Just A Ride" by Jenova 7 from the album Dusted Jazz Volume One (2011)
"Young, Wild & Free" by Snoop Dogg and Wiz Khalifa from the album Mac & Devin Go to High School (2012)

References

1973 albums
Ode Records albums
Tom Scott (saxophonist) albums